Jao Tsung-I or Rao Zongyi (9 August 1917 – 6 February 2018) was a Hong Kong sinologist, calligrapher, historian and painter. A versatile and prolific scholar, he contributed to many fields of humanities, including history, archaeology, epigraphy, folklores, religion, art history, musicology, literature, and Near Eastern Studies. He published more than 100 books and about 1,000 academic articles over a career spanning more than 80 years.

Jao and Ji Xianlin were considered China's two greatest humanities academics by their contemporaries. Called the "pride of Hong Kong" by Chinese Premier Li Keqiang, Jao has won many awards including the Grand Bauhinia Medal, the highest honour bestowed by the Hong Kong government. The Jao Tsung-I Petite Ecole of the University of Hong Kong, the Jao Studies Foundation, and the Jao Tsung-I Academy in Kowloon have been founded in his name.

Early life and education
Jao was born in 1917 in Chao'an (now Xiangqiao) into a scholarly Teochew family of Hakka ancestry.

He also used the courtesy names Gu'an and Bolian, and the art name Xuantang. Largely home-schooled and self-taught, he wrote The Scholastic Journals of Gu Tinglin at the age of 14.

Career
Jao taught at several Chinese mainland colleges before moving to Hong Kong in 1949. In the following years, he taught at the University of Hong Kong, the National University of Singapore, Institute of History and Philology of Academia Sinica in Taiwan, the Chinese University of Hong Kong, École française d'Extrême-Orient, École pratique des hautes études of Paris, and Yale University in the US. He was also honorary professor at several prestigious Chinese universities including Peking University, Fudan University, Nanjing University, and Zhejiang University.

Academic research
Jao was a highly versatile and prolific scholar. His research covered a vast range of humanities, including oracle bones, archaeology, epigraphy, folklores, religion, art history, musicology, literature, and Near Eastern Studies. Over his 80-year-long career, he published more than 100 books and about 1,000 scholarly papers. Under the influence of the French Assyriologist Jean Bottéro, he learnt cuneiform and spent ten years translating the Akkadian epic Enūma Eliš into Chinese, filling a major gap in Chinese knowledge of ancient Babylon. 

In 1959, he published Yindai zhenbu renwu tongkao, which earned him the Prix Stanislas Julien from the Académie des Inscriptions et Belles-Lettres in 1962. In 2000, he was awarded the Grand Bauhinia Medal, the highest honor bestowed by the Hong Kong government.

Arts
In addition to his academic pursuits, Jao was also a renowned calligrapher, painter, and musician. He created his own calligraphic style called Jao's Clerical Script. His calligraphic art installation, "The Wisdom Path", has become a landmark in Ngong Ping, Hong Kong. He was a master performer of the ancient Chinese instrument guqin.

In August 2017, the Hongkong Post issued a set of six special stamps featuring Jao's paintings and calligraphy.

Death
He died on 6 February 2018, at the age of 100 (101 by East Asian age reckoning).

See also
 Jao Tsung-I Academy

References

1917 births
2018 deaths
Chinese archaeologists
Chinese centenarians
Chinese sinologists
Academic staff of the École pratique des hautes études
Guqin players
Academic staff of the Chinese University of Hong Kong
Hong Kong calligraphers
Hong Kong centenarians
20th-century Hong Kong historians
Hong Kong painters
Hong Kong people of Hakka descent
Members of Academia Sinica
Men centenarians
Academic staff of the National University of Singapore
Painters from Guangdong
People from Chaozhou
Recipients of the Grand Bauhinia Medal
Republic of China calligraphers
Republic of China painters
Academic staff of the University of Hong Kong
Yale University faculty
Chinese emigrants to British Hong Kong